The Jiroft culture also known as the Intercultural style or the Halilrud style, is an early Bronze Age (3rd millennium BC) archaeological culture, located in the territory of present-day Sistan and Baluchestan and Kermān Provinces of Iran. 

The proposed type site is Konar Sandal, near Jiroft in the Halil River area. Other significant sites associated with the culture include Shahr-e Sukhteh (Burnt City), Tepe Bampur, Espiedej, Shahdad, Tal-i-Iblis and Tepe Yahya. 

The grouping of these sites as an "independent Bronze Age civilization with its own architecture and language", intermediate between Elam to the west and the Indus Valley civilization to the east, was first proposed by Yusef Majidzadeh, head of the archaeological excavation team in Jiroft (south central Iran). The hypothesis is based on a collection of artifacts that have been formally excavated and  recovered from looters by Iranian authorities; accepted by many to have derived from the Jiroft area (as reported by online Iranian news services, beginning in 2001).

Discovery and excavation

Early excavations at Kerman were conducted by Sir Aurel Stein around 1930. One of the most notable archaeological excavations done in Kerman Province was one done by a group led by Professor Joseph Caldwell from Illinois State Museum in 1966 (Tal-i-Iblis) and Lamberg-Karlovsky from Harvard University in 1967 (Tepe Yahya, Sogan Valley, Dolatabad). Many artifacts associated with Jiroft were recovered from looters described as "destitute villagers" who had scavenged the area south of Jiroft before 2001, when a team led by Yusef Majidzadeh began excavations.

The primary Jiroft site consists of two mounds a few kilometers apart, called Konar Sandal A and B with a height of 13 and 21 meters, respectively (approximate location ). At Konar Sandal B, a two-story, windowed citadel with a base of close to 13.5 hectares was found. The team uncovered more than two square kilometers of remains from a city dating back to at least the late 3rd millennium BC. The data Madjidzadeh's team has gathered demonstrates that Jiroft's heyday was from 2500 BC to 2200 BC.

The looted artifacts and some vessels recovered by the excavators were of the so-called "intercultural style" type of pottery known from Mesopotamia and the Iranian Plateau, and since the 1960s from nearby Tepe Yahya in Baft. The "Jiroft civilization" hypothesis proposes that this "intercultural style" is in fact the distinctive style of a previously unknown, long-lived civilization.

This is not universally accepted; archaeologist Oscar Muscarella of the Metropolitan Museum of Art criticizes that the excavators resorted to sensationalist announcements while being more slow in publishing scholarly reports, and their claims that the site's stratigraphy shows continuity into the 4th millennium as overly optimistic. Muscarella does nevertheless acknowledge the importance of the site.

According to Majidzadeh, geophysical operations by French experts in the region indicate the existence at least 10 historical and archaeological periods in the region belonging to different civilizations who lived in this area during different periods of time in history. According to the French experts who studied this area, the evidence remained from these civilizations may be traced up to 11 meters under the ground.

"What is obvious is that the evidence of Tal-i-Iblis culture in Bardsir can be traced in all parts of the region. Tal-i-Iblis culture, known as Ali Abad period (fourth millennium BC) was revealed by Joseph R. Caldwell, American archaeologist," said Majidzadeh.

Helmand culture
The Helmand culture of western Afghanistan was a Bronze Age culture of the 3rd millennium BC. Some scholars link it with Shahr-i Sokhta, Mundigak, and Bampur.

The term "Helmand civilization" was proposed by M. Tosi. This civilization flourished between 2500 and 1900 BC, and may have coincided with the great flourishing of the Indus Valley Civilization. This was also the final phase of Periods III and IV of Shahr-i Sokhta, and the last part of Mundigak Period IV.

Thus, the Jiroft culture is closely related to the Helmand culture. The Jiroft culture flourished in eastern Iran, and the Helmand culture in western Afghanistan at the same time. In fact, they may represent the same cultural area. The Mehrgarh culture, on the other hand, is far earlier.

Writing system

An inscription, discovered in a palace, was carved on a brick whose lower left corner only has remained, explained Yusef Majidzadeh, head of the Jiroft excavation team. "The two remaining lines are enough to recognize the Elamite script," he added. "The only ancient inscriptions known to experts before the Jiroft discovery were cuneiform and hieroglyph," said Majidzadeh, adding that "The new-found inscription is formed by geometric shapes and no linguist around the world has been able to decipher it yet."

Some Iranian archeologists believe the discovered inscription is the most ancient script found so far, predating these others, and that the Elamite written language originated in Jiroft, where the writing system developed first and was then spread across the country.

Possible connection with Aratta 
Majidzadeh has attempted to identify the Jiroft sites with the land of Aratta mentioned in Sumerian sources. His conclusions have been met with skepticism from a number of scholars. Other conjectures (e.g. Daniel T. Potts, Piotr Steinkeller) have connected Konar Sandal with the obscure city-state of Marhashi, that apparently lay to the east of Elam proper.

See also

Prehistoric Iran
List of Iranian artifacts abroad
Kulli culture
International Rankings of Iran in History
Konar Sandal on map

References

Sources
Jiroft, Fabuleuse Decouverte en Iran, Dossiers Archeologica 287, October 2003.
Yousef Mazidzadeh, Jiroft earliest oriental civilization (2004).
O. White Muscarella, Jiroft and "Jiroft-Aratta": A Review Article of Yousef Madjidzadeh, Jiroft: The Earliest Oriental Civilization, Bulletin of the Asia Institute 15 (2005) 173–198.
Andrew Lawler, Ancient Writing or Modern Fakery?, Science 3 August 2007: Vol. 317. no. 5838, pp. 588–589.
Andrew Lawler, Iranian Dig Opens Window on New Civilization, Science 21 May 2004: Vol. 304. no. 5674, pp. 1096–1097.
M.R. Maheri The Early Civilizations of Kerman (تمدّن های نخستین کرمان), Markaze Kerman Shenasaee (2000), 1st edition, 

Jiroft, Fabuleuse Decouverte en Iran, Dossiers Archeologica 287, October 2003.
Yousef Mazidzadeh, Jiroft earliest oriental civilization (2004).
O. White Muscarella, Jiroft and "Jiroft-Aratta": A Review Article of Yousef Madjidzadeh, Jiroft: The Earliest Oriental Civilization, Bulletin of the Asia Institute 15 (2005) 173–198.
Andrew Lawler, Ancient Writing or Modern Fakery?, Science 3 August 2007: Vol. 317. no. 5838, pp. 588–589.
Andrew Lawler, Iranian Dig Opens Window on New Civilization, Science 21 May 2004: Vol. 304. no. 5674, pp. 1096–1097.
Jiroft and "Jiroft-Aratta" A Review Article of Yousef Madjidzadeh

External links

 Jiroft in Encyclopedia Iranica
 saudiaramcoworld.com: What Was Jiroft? 
The Writing Tablet from Konar Sandal B (Jiroft)
Jiroft and "Jiroft-Aratta" A Review Article of Yousef Madjidzadeh

Prehistoric Iran
Archaeological cultures of the Near East
Archaeology of Iran
History of Kerman Province
History of Sistan and Baluchestan Province
National works of Iran